"Don't be evil" was a phrase used in Google's corporate code of conduct, which it also formerly preceded as a motto.

Following Google's corporate restructuring under the conglomerate Alphabet Inc. in October 2015, Alphabet took "Do the right thing" as its motto, also forming the opening of its corporate code of conduct. The original motto was retained in Google's code of conduct, now a subsidiary of Alphabet. In April 2018, the motto was removed from the code of conduct's preface and retained in its last sentence.

History
The motto was first suggested either by Google employee Paul Buchheit at a meeting about corporate values that took place in early 2000 or in 2001 or, according to another account, by Google engineer Amit Patel in 1999.  Buchheit, the creator of Gmail, said he "wanted something that, once you put it in there, would be hard to take out", adding that the slogan was "also a bit of a jab at a lot of the other companies, especially our competitors, who at the time, in our opinion, were kind of exploiting the users to some extent". 

While the official corporate philosophy of Google does not contain the words "Don't be evil", they were included in the prospectus (on Form S-1) of Google's 2004 IPO (a letter from Google's founders, later called the "'Don't Be Evil' manifesto"): "Don't be evil.  We believe strongly that in the long term, we will be better served—as shareholders and in all other ways—by a company that does good things for the world even if we forgo some short term gains." The motto is sometimes incorrectly stated as Do no evil.

By early 2018, the motto was still cited in the preface to Google's Code of Conduct:

 
"Don't be evil." Googlers generally apply those words to how we serve our users. But "Don't be evil" is much more than that...

The Google Code of Conduct is one of the ways we put "Don't be evil" into practice...

Between 21 April and 4 May 2018, Google removed the motto from the preface, leaving a mention in the final line: "And remember… don't be evil, and if you see something that you think isn't right – speak up!"

Interpretations 
In their 2004 founders' letter prior to their initial public offering, Larry Page and Sergey Brin argued that their "Don't be evil" culture prohibited conflicts of interest, and required objectivity and an absence of bias:

In 2009, Chris Hoofnagle, director of University of California, Berkeley Law's information privacy programs, stated that Google's original intention expressed by the "don't be evil" motto was linked to the company's separation of search results from advertising. However, he observed that clearly separating search results from sponsored links is required by law, thus, Google's practice had since become mainstream and was no longer remarkable or good.  Hoofnagle argued that Google should abandon the motto because:

In a 2013 NPR interview, Eric Schmidt revealed that when Larry Page and Sergey Brin recommended the motto as a guiding principle for Google, he "thought this was the stupidest rule ever", but then changed his opinion after a meeting where an engineer successfully referred to the motto when expressing concerns about a planned advertising product, which was eventually cancelled. Journalists have raised questions about the actual definition of what Google considered "evil".  On the user-facing 'What We Believe' page, Google appeared to replace the original motto altogether (a carefully reworded version stood as of 10 April 2015, "You can make money without doing evil", which varied significantly from the absolute imperative of DON'T be evil).

Use in criticism of Google
Critics of Google frequently spin the motto in a negative way, such as InfoWorld's 2014 article "Google? Evil? You have no idea". Google's 2012 announcement to "begin tracking users universally across all its services" (via "Google Plus" accounts) resulted in public backlash on the motto, like "Google's Broken Promise: The End of 'Don't Be Evil'" on Gizmodo. In the same year, major social networks even co-developed a Don't be evil browser bookmarklet (specifically to expose alleged SERP manipulation promoting Google-owned content over that of others).

On 16 May 2013, Margaret Hodge MP, the chair of the United Kingdom Public Accounts Committee, accused Google of being "calculated and unethical" over its use of highly contrived and artificial distinctions to avoid paying billions of pounds in corporation tax owed by its UK operations. The company was accused by the committee, which represents the interests of all UK taxpayers, of being "evil" for not paying its "fair amount of tax". She told Matt Brittin, head of Google UK, "I think that you do evil". In 2015, the UK Government introduced a new law intended to penalise Google and other large multinational corporations' artificial tax avoidance.

In 2015, The Commercial Appeal reported that "critics say Google's recent moves belie search giant's motto".

Lawsuit
On 29 November 2021, former Google employees filed a lawsuit claiming that Google broke their own moral code by firing them as retaliation for their part in  drawing attention to and organizing employees against “controversial projects” which were “doing evil”. The employees felt that they were acting in alignment with the Code of Conduct; "since Google's contract tells employees that they can be fired for failing to abide by the motto, 'don't be evil'”, the motto “amounts to a contractual obligation that the tech giant has violated.”

See also
 Censorship by Google
 Criticism of Google
 Ethical code
 Evil corporation
 Friendly artificial intelligence
 Googlization
 List of mottos
 Surveillance capitalism

References

External links
 
 
Google Code of Conduct Alphabet Investor Relations 

2000 neologisms
Business ethics
Google
Mottos
Slogans
Good and evil

sv:Google#Affärskultur